Adadi Mohamed Rajabu (born January 20, 1955) is a Tanzanian politician and a member of the Chama Cha Mapinduzi political party. He was elected MP representing Muheza in 2015. He is also the Chairman of the house committee on Home Affairs, Defence and Security Parliamentary.

References 

1955 births
Living people
Chama Cha Mapinduzi politicians
Tanzanian MPs 2015–2020